The 1962–63 season was the 90th season of competitive football in Scotland and the 66th season of the Scottish Football League.

Scottish League Division One

Champions: Rangers
Relegated: Clyde, Raith Rovers

Scottish League Division Two

Promoted: St Johnstone, East Stirlingshire

Cups

Other Honours

National

County

 - aggregate over two legs

Highland League

National team

Scotland won the 1963 British Home Championship.

Key:
 (H) = Home match
 (A) = Away match
 BHC = British Home Championship

Notes and references

External links
Scottish Football Historical Archive

 
Seasons in Scottish football